Wellesley is a town in Norfolk County, Massachusetts, United States. Wellesley is part of Greater Boston. The population was 29,550 at the time of the 2020 census. Wellesley College, Babson College, and a campus of Massachusetts Bay Community College are located in the town.

History 
Wellesley was settled in the 1600s as part of Dedham, Massachusetts. It was subsequently a part of Needham, Massachusetts called West Needham, Massachusetts. On October 23, 1880, West Needham residents voted to secede from Needham, and the town of Wellesley was later christened by the Massachusetts legislature on April 6, 1881. The town was named after the estate of local benefactor Horatio Hollis Hunnewell.

Wellesley's population grew by over 80 percent around the 1920s.

Geography
Wellesley is located in eastern Massachusetts. It is bordered on the east by Newton, on the north by Weston, on the south by Needham and Dover and on the west by Natick.

Neighborhoods
 
Wellesley Farms
The Fells
Wellesley Hills (02481)
Wellesley Square (02482)
Poets' Corner 
Babson Park (02457)
Peirce Estates
College Heights

Climate
Wellesley has a warm-summer humid continental climate (Dfb under the Köppen climate classification system), with high humidity and precipitation year-round.

Demographics

The Census Bureau has also defined the town as a census-designated place with an area exactly equivalent to the town.

As of the census of 2000, there were 26,613 people, 8,594 households, and 6,540 families residing in the town. According to a 2007 Census Bureau estimate, the racial makeup of the town was 84.6% White, 10.0% Asian, 2.2% Black, 0.01% Native American, 0.01% Pacific Islander, 1.4% from other races, and 1.7% from two or more races. Hispanic or Latino of any race were 3.4% of the population.

There were 8,594 households, out of which 39.9% had children under the age of 18 living with them, 67.2% were married couples living together, 7.1% had a female householder with no husband present, and 23.9% were non-families. 20.7% of all households were made up of individuals, and 10.5% had someone living alone who was 65 years of age or older.  The average household size was 2.70 and the average family size was 3.14.

In the town, the population was spread out, with 25.1% under the age of 18, 13.9% from 18 to 24, 22.9% from 25 to 44, 24.2% from 45 to 64, and 13.9% who were 65 years of age or older.  The median age was 38 years. For every 100 females, there were 77.9 males.  For every 100 females age 18 and over, there were 71.1 males.

The median income for a household was $159,167, and the median income for a family was $186,518. The per capita income in the town was $72,046. About 2.4% of families and 3.8% of the population were below the poverty line, including 4.0% of those under age 18 and 2.1% of those age 65 or over.

Economy

Wellesley is home to the headquarters of many local, national and global businesses including Benchmark Senior Living, Blank Label Apparel, Eagle Investment Systems, EPG Incorporated, GrandBanks Capital, Harvard Pilgrim Health Care, Livingston and Haynes PC, Roche Bros., and Sun Life Financial U.S.

Top employers
According to Wellesley's 2018 Comprehensive Annual Financial Report, the top employers in the city are:

Arts and culture

Wellesley's Wonderful Weekend 
Each year the weekend before Memorial Day, the town sponsors the annual Wellesley's Wonderful Weekend, which includes the annual veterans' parade and fireworks. On May 18, 2008, The Beach Boys performed in a concert on the Wellesley High School athletic fields in front of an estimated 10,000 town residents and fans. The funds for the performance, an estimated $250,000, were made as a gift by an anonymous donor and lifelong fan of the band.

Wellesley Symphony Orchestra 
The Wellesley Symphony Orchestra presents classical, pops, and family concerts at Mass Bay Community College at its Wellesley campus.

Religious institutions
The town of Wellesley is home to several religious institutions. Wellesley contains two Jewish institutions including Temple Beth Elohim and the Wellesley Chabad Center. Predominantly Christian Wellesley contains many churches, including Wellesley Congregational Church, St. Andrew's Episcopal Church, St. Paul's Catholic Church, Christ Church United Methodist, Wellesley Hills Congregational Church (also known as The Hills Church), First Church of Christ-Scientist, St. John the Evangelist Catholic Church, the Metrowest Baptist Church, Milestone Wellesley, and Unitarian Universalist Society of Wellesley Hills, and Wellesley Friends Meeting (Quakers).

Horticulture
The Wellesley College campus includes greenhouses and the H. H. Hunnewell Arboretum. This is not to be confused with the neighboring private H. H. Hunnewell estate. The Elm Bank Horticulture Center is home to the Massachusetts Horticultural Society. Although the entrance is in Wellesley, access is over a small private bridge over the Charles River, so Elm Bank is therefore in the neighboring town of Dover.

Historic district
The town designated Cottage Street and its nearby alleys as the historic district in its zoning plan. Most houses in this district were built around the 1860s and qualify as protected buildings certified by the town's historic commission.

Recent construction
The town's historic 19th-century inn was demolished to make way for condominiums and mixed-use development in 2006. The Wellesley Country Club clubhouse, which is the building where the town was founded, was demolished in 2008, and a new clubhouse was built. The town's pre-World War II high school building was torn down and replaced with a brand new high school finished in 2012. The entire 1960s-style Linden Street strip-mall has been replaced by "Linden Square"—a shopping district that includes a flagship Roche Bros. supermarket, restaurants, cafes, clothing stores, along with a mixture of national chains and local shops.

Library
Wellesley opened its new Free Library building in 2003, which is part of the Minuteman Library Network.  Due to the structure of budget override votes and perhaps the size of the new main branch of the library, the two branch libraries—one in Wellesley Hills, which was purpose-built to be a branch library in the 1920s, another in Wellesley Fells—closed in the summer of 2006. The branch libraries reopened in September 2008. The main library branch near Wellesley Square underwent a major interior renovation in 2021.

Government

The town government has been run by town meeting since the town's founding. Since Proposition 2½ limited property tax increases to 2.5% per year in 1980, the town has had to ask residents for a number of overrides to maintain funding for certain programs. Although the main 2005 override passed, a simultaneous supplemental override to preserve certain specific programs and services failed by 17 votes. The 2006 override passed with a large majority. Wellesley also receives funding from the state government. Local roads have been repaved several times in the 1990s and 2000s.

The town is part of the Massachusetts Senate's Norfolk, Bristol and Middlesex district.

On December 18, 2014, Wellesley College and the Town of Wellesley announced that the College's Board of Trustees had chosen the town's $35-million bid for the purchase of 46 acres of land adjacent to its campus. Under this agreement, at least 50% of the North 40 property will be preserved in perpetuity as open space. A special town meeting in January 2015 resulted in a near-unanimous vote in favor of the purchase, and in March 2015, 80 percent of residents that cast votes at the Town election, voted to approve the purchase.

Reducing carbon footprint

In 2009 the town established the Municipal Energy Efficiency Committee (MEEC) made up of representatives from various town departments, to develop and evaluate municipal policies to reduce energy use.

In 2010 Wellesley's Sustainable Energy Committee (SEC) was formed by Town Meeting. The committee's primary objective was a 10% town-wide reduction in Wellesley's carbon footprint and 20% reduction in carbon footprint for all municipal departments by the end of 2013. In 2014 Town Meeting voted to support a new goal of 25% reduction by 2020 using 2007 as the base year. The committee is responsible for Wellesley's adoption of the Massachusetts Stretch Building Code approved by Town Meeting effective January 2012.

In 2013, the committee organized Wellesley's Green Collaborative, a group of organizations that are concerned about environmental issues in Wellesley and beyond. Dozens of like-minded organizations are represented including the Natural Resources Commission, a five-member elected board of town residents; Wellesley Conservation Council, a private, non-profit, land trust and conservation education organization incorporated in 1958; and Sustainable Wellesley, a group of volunteers who encourage sustainability in Wellesley and the surrounding area through events, education, and action.

In 2014 the Sustainable Energy Committee served to double participation in the town's POWER TO CHOOSE program and organized the "More POWER TO CHOOSE" solar program.

Natural resources protection

Wellesley is the longest running Tree City USA community of any city or town in Massachusetts. Wellesley's Tree Bylaw became effective July 1, 2011, requiring property owners to protect certain trees and critical root zones during construction projects, and replace trees that are cut down or donate money to a special tree fund. The town's Natural Resource Protection (NRP) Development bylaw, approved by Town Meeting in 2013, applies to any subdivision generating five or more lots. This bylaw requires a minimum of 50% of the property be preserved as open space in exchange for reduced lot sizes without increasing density.

Established in 1979, Wellesley has a unique elected Natural Resources Commission (NRC) bearing the statutory authority and responsibility of Park Commissions, Conservation Commissions, Tree Wardens, Town Forest Committees, and Forestry and Pest Control Officers. The commission maintains Wellesley's two Community Gardens and maintains a trail network that includes 26 miles of marked trails interconnecting open spaces and conservation lands for walking, dog walking, jogging, bicycling, cross-country skiing, and more.

In 2001 the commission, in collaboration with the Health, Public Works and School department, developed a pesticide awareness program resulting in an Organic Pest Management Policy governing pesticide use on all town-owned property.

In 2003 the commission created the Preservation Master Plan for Fuller Brook Park in collaboration with Wellesley's Department of Public Works. This major restoration project was completed in 2017. In 2009, the commission launched the Green Wellesley Campaign advocating for sustainability by raising awareness and promoting increased environmental action. That campaign has been renamed the Grow Green Wellesley initiative, which promotes earth-friendly lawn and landscaping practices.

Education

On the Massachusetts Comprehensive Assessment System test, the district regularly scores higher than the state average. The school system also contains a middle school and seven elementary schools (Bates, Upham, Schofield, Fiske, Hardy, Hunnewell, and Sprague). Wellesley includes a primary and secondary school which are Wellesley Middle School (also known as Wellesley Junior High) and Wellesley High School, respectively; and are the home of the Raiders.  

The town contains a private elementary school, Tenacre Country Day School, one private Catholic elementary school (St. John the Evangelist) and a preparatory school for girls, Dana Hall School. Also, the Wellesley A Better Chance outfit started in the early 1970s brings promising young women from underserved areas into town to attend Wellesley High School and live nearby.

Wellesley also contains the main campus of three colleges: Wellesley College, a women's liberal arts college, Massachusetts Bay Community College, a two-year public college, and Babson, a business college.

Green Schools

Wellesley Green Schools was established in 2006. The No Idling Campaign received an Excellence in Energy and Environmental Education Award from the state of Massachusetts in 2014.

The town's new high school opened in February 2012 and includes such elements as green vegetated roof, geothermal heat pump and Solar thermal cooling, Solar Photovoltaic system, and rainwater recovery systems.

Media
Events of significance to members of the Wellesley community are recorded in two local news publications: The Wellesley Townsman has been published since 1906, and The Swellesley Report since 2005. Both are available online and digitized copies of the paper-based Townsman are available from the Wellesley Free Library.

Infrastructure

Transportation

Wellesley has had rail service to Boston since 1833. Rail service is currently provided through Wellesley's participation in the MBTA, which offers a total of 17 weekdays Commuter Rail trains inbound towards Boston and outbound towards Framingham and Worcester. Wellesley's stations are (east to west) Wellesley Farms, Wellesley Hills, and Wellesley Square. The Wellesley Farms station is listed on the U.S. National Register of Historic Places. MWRTA bus service also runs along Walnut Street, Cedar Street, and Route 9.

The highways Interstate 95/Massachusetts Route 128, Massachusetts Route 9, Massachusetts route 16 and Massachusetts route 135 run through Wellesley.

For elders and people with disabilities there is a specific MBTA-based service, The Ride, which offers free or low-cost door-to-door service by appointment.

Wellesley's Council on Aging contracts out a daily low-cost minibus service offering elderly access to several local medical facilities and the Woodland MBTA station. Further afield is the Springwell Senior Medical Escort Program / Busy Bee Transportation Service for rides to medical & non-medical services in the area. There is also a monthly minibus to the Natick Mall.

Municipal light plant
Wellesley is serviced by the Wellesley Municipal Light Plant.
the three colleges voluntarily pay a premium to purchase electricity generated by wind power.

In 2012, Wellesley was designated a Green Power Community by the United States Environmental Protection Agency.

Notable people

 Danny Ainge, executive director of basketball operations and general manager of the Boston Celtics
 Ray Allen, former player for the Boston Celtics
 Emily Greene Balch, Nobel Peace Prize winner
 Roger Nash Baldwin, co-founder of American Civil Liberties Union
 Arthur Batcheller, U.S. radio inspector
 Katharine Lee Bates, author of "America the Beautiful"
 Gamaliel Bradford, poet, biographer
 Dee Brown, former basketball player for the Boston Celtics
 Laurence E. Bunker, United States Army colonel, aide to Gen. Douglas MacArthur, leader within the John Birch Society
 R. Nicholas Burns, former U.S. Under Secretary of State, Ambassador to NATO and to Greece, and State Department spokesman
 Karl E. Case, developer of the Case–Shiller index
 Dan Chiasson, poet and New Yorker critic
 Gene Clapp, Olympic silver medalist men's eight
 Katharine Coman, historian, professor of economics and sociology, author
 Greg Comella, former professional football player with the New York Giants, Titans, Texans and Buccaneers
 Jane Curtin, comedian, original cast member of Saturday Night Live
 Richard Darman, economist, former head of the Office of Management and Budget
 Erik Davis (baseball), former pitcher for the Washington Nationals
 Blake Dietrick, WNBA basketball player with the Seattle Storm and former standout with the Princeton Tigers
 Dennis Eckersley, former pitcher for the Oakland A's
 Carl Everett, former center fielder for the Boston Red Sox
 Nicole Freedman (born 1972), Olympic cyclist
 Nate Freiman (born 1986), first baseman for the Oakland Athletics
 Wendell Arthur Garrity Jr., U.S. District Court judge 
 Curt Gowdy, sports commentator
 Michael S. Greco, President of American, Massachusetts & New England bar associations
 Lester Grinspoon, psychiatrist, professor, and drug policy reform advocate 
 Gordon Hayward, small forward for the Boston Celtics
 H. H. Hunnewell (1810-1902), railroad financier and horticulturist
 Andrea Jung, CEO of Avon Products
 Phil Laak, professional poker player, winner of 2004 World Poker Tour
 Christopher Leggett, film producer
 Xihong Lin, Department of Biostatistics chair at the Harvard School of Public Health 
 Gregory Mankiw, Harvard economics professor
 Daisuke Matsuzaka, former pitcher for the Boston Red Sox
 Fred McLafferty, professor, analytical chemist, author, inventor, leading developer of mass spectrometry
 Drew Meekins, figure skater
 Ossian Everett Mills, founder of Phi Mu Alpha Sinfonia fraternity
 Brian Moynihan, CEO of Bank of America
 Bill Mueller, former third baseman for the Boston Red Sox
 Joseph E. Murray, surgeon, winner of the Nobel Prize in Medicine, 1990
 Vladimir Nabokov, Russian-American author
 Joe Nash, retired NFL player for the Seattle Seahawks
 Sylvia Plath, poet and author, The Bell Jar
 Richard Preston and Douglas Preston, best-selling authors
 Aneesh Raman, former presidential speechwriter at the White House and CNN Middle East Correspondent
 Edward Thomas Ryan, president, American Society of Tropical Medicine and Hygiene; professor, Harvard University
 James St. Clair, defense lawyer for Richard Nixon during Watergate
 Jack Sanford, former MLB pitcher, 1957 MLB Rookie of the Year Award recipient
 Billy Squier, rock musician
 Brad Stevens, head coach of the Boston Celtics
 Biz Stone, Twitter co-founder
 Steven Tyler, rock musician, lived in Wellesley during the late 1990s and early 2000s
 Michael von Clemm, banker, anthropologist and founder of Canary Wharf
 Rasheed Wallace, retired professional basketball player
 Greg Yaitanes, Emmy Award-winning film director, writer, actor
 Eddie Yost, baseball player and coach

References

External links

 Town of Wellesley website

 
Towns in Norfolk County, Massachusetts
Populated places established in 1660
1660 establishments in Massachusetts
Populated places established in 1881
Towns in Massachusetts